Zhuravka is a rural locality (a khutor) in Alexandrovskoye Rural Settlement, Zhirnovsky District, Volgograd Oblast, Russia. The population was 60 as of 2010.

Geography 
Zhuravka is located on the right bank of the Medveditsa River, 19 km northwest of Zhirnovsk (the district's administrative centre) by road. Alexandrovka is the nearest rural locality.

References 

Rural localities in Zhirnovsky District